Kirkby Thore is a civil parish in the Eden District, Cumbria, England.  It contains 14 listed buildings that are recorded in the National Heritage List for England.  Of these, two are listed at Grade II*, the middle of the three grades, and the others are at Grade II, the lowest grade.  The parish contains the village of Kirkby Thore and the surrounding countryside.  Most of the listed buildings are in the village, and consist of houses and associated structures, farmhouses, farm buildings, a church, a house that originated as a medieval hall, a community hall, an animal pound and an associated structure, and a structure built from Roman material.  The listed buildings outside the village are a farm and associated farm buildings.


Key

Buildings

References

Citations

Sources

Lists of listed buildings in Cumbria